A Is for Atom (1953) is a 14-minute promotional animated short documentary film created by John Sutherland and sponsored by General Electric (GE). The short documentary, which is now in the public domain, explains what an atom is, how nuclear energy is released from certain kinds of atoms, the peacetime uses of nuclear power, and the by-products of nuclear fission. The film is Sutherland's most-decorated film, having won numerous honors at film festivals.

The film also received a theatrical release, opening at the Pantages and Hillstreet Theatres in Los Angeles on July 2, 1953. The distributor was Al O. Bondy, who made the short available for free.

Synopsis
A narrator is relating what is an atom and how atomic energy can be harnessed by man to produce "limitless" energy. Dr. Atom (a caricature with an atom for a head) then explains the similarities between the solar system and atomic structure. He then goes on to relate how the atom is made up of protons, neutrons, and electrons. After this, the narrator explains how there are more than 90 elements with many possible isotopes for each.

The history of atomic energy is then over viewed beginning with the discovery of artificial transmutation. This then led to the discovery of nuclear fission and eventually nuclear weapons and nuclear energy using the chain reaction of radioactive material. The Oakridge uranium factory is then discussed as well as the first nuclear reactor and the first uses of plutonium. The future of fantastical nuclear power plants is then explained. The short ends on the uses of radio isotopes in medicine and agriculture.

The film includes a blue "nuclear giant" character, very similar to Dr. Manhattan from the graphic novel Watchmen.

Re-release & update
A is for Atom was re-released by General Electric in 1964. John Sutherland Studios was contracted by GE to modernize the film. Changes included tighter editing, new music, new narration (Bud Hiestand did the voice-over on the original) and a focus on nuclear power as opposed to nuclear bombs.

See also
 Destination Earth
 "Our Friend the Atom"
 Your Safety First
 Atoms for Peace

References

External links
 
 

1953 short films
American animated short films
American animated documentary films
Sponsored films
Documentary films about nuclear technology
General Electric sponsorships
Films scored by Eugene Poddany
1950s animated short films
1950s American animated films
Articles containing video clips
1953 animated films
1950s English-language films
American short documentary films